Shirley Kersey Turner (born July 3, 1941) is an American Democratic Party politician, who has been serving in the New Jersey State Senate since 1998, where she represents the 15th Legislative District.

Early life 
Turner was born in Dover, New Jersey and graduated from Dover High School in 1960. She received a B.A. from Trenton State College (now The College of New Jersey) in Education and an M.A. from Rider College in Guidance and Counseling, and has done postgraduate work in education at Rutgers University.

Turner resides in the Lawrenceville section of Lawrence Township. Before entering state politics, Senator Turner served on the Mercer County Board of Chosen Freeholders from 1983 to 1986, where she served as Freeholder Vice President. Before being elected to the State Senate, Turner served in New Jersey's lower house, the General Assembly, from 1994 to 1998.

New Jersey Senate 
In the 1997 general election, Turner defeated incumbent Republican Dick LaRossa, making him the only Republican Senator to lose his seat. Turner was Senate President Pro Tempore, a position which she has held since 2004 to 2010. She serves in the Senate on the Education Committee (as Chair) and as a member of the Budget and Appropriations Committee. In a 2010 vote on same sex marriage, Turner was one of six Democrats to vote against the bill to legalize it. However, in a 2012 vote on a similar bill, she supported the measure (which would be vetoed by Governor Chris Christie).

Committees 
Committee assignments for the current session are:
Education, Vice-Chair
Joint Committee on Economic Justice and Equal Employment Opportunity
Economic Growth
State Government, Wagering, Tourism & Historic Preservation

District 15 
Each of the 40 districts in the New Jersey Legislature has one representative in the New Jersey Senate and two members in the New Jersey General Assembly. The representatives from the 15th District for the 2022—23 Legislative Session are:
Senator Shirley Turner (D)
Assemblywoman Verlina Reynolds-Jackson (D)
Assemblyman Anthony Verrelli (D)

Election history

Senate

Assembly

References

External links
Senator Turner's legislative web page, New Jersey Legislature
New Jersey Legislature financial disclosure forms
2011 2010 2009 2008 2007 2006 2005 2004
Senator Shirley K. Turner, Project Vote Smart

1941 births
Living people
African-American state legislators in New Jersey
African-American women in politics
Democratic Party members of the New Jersey General Assembly
County commissioners in New Jersey
Democratic Party New Jersey state senators
People from Dover, New Jersey
People from Lawrence Township, Mercer County, New Jersey
Politicians from Mercer County, New Jersey
Rider University alumni
Rutgers University alumni
The College of New Jersey alumni
Women state legislators in New Jersey
21st-century American politicians
21st-century American women politicians
21st-century African-American women
21st-century African-American politicians
20th-century African-American people
20th-century African-American women